The 2018 World Karate Championships were the 24th edition of the World Karate Championships, and were held in Madrid, Spain from November 6 to November 11, 2018.

Medalists

Men

Women

Medal table

Participating nations 
1117 athletes from 140 nations competed.

 (3)
 (16)
 (1)
 (3)
 (6)
 (8)
 (12)
 (13)
 (15)
 (3)
 (14)
 (12)
 (1)
 (14)
 (2)
 (16)
 (7)
 (7)
 (2)
 (2)
 (9)
 (14)
 (7)
 (1)
 (4)
 (7)
 (12)
 (14)
 (16)
 (7)
 (12)
 (16)
 (3)
 (2)
 (4)
 (10)
 (8)
 (13)
 (1)
 (14)
 (3)
 (14)
 (4)
 (15)
 (3)
 (2)
 (11)
 (15)
 (2)
 (5)
 (14)
 (5)
 (5)
 (10)
 (13)
 (11)
 (5)
 (16)
 (12)
 (16)
 (2)
 (11)
 (7)
 (15)
 (11)
 (1)
 (16)
 (10)
 (14)
 (13)
 (8)
 (11)
 (12)
 (3)
 (1)
 (8)
 (5)
 (13)
 (3)
 (7)
 (1)
 (13)
 (4)
 (11)
 (11)
 (8)
 (4)
 (5)
 (10)
 (9)
 (1)
 (3)
 (1)
 (7)
 (2)
 (4)
 (5)
 (6)
 (10)
 (3)
 (15)
 (3)
 (8)
 (12)
 (1)
 (3)
Refugee Karate Team (2)
 (15)
 (16)
 (1)
 (7)
 (7)
 (10)
 (16)
 (1)
 (1)
 (15)
 (7)
 (9)
 (9)
 (16)
 (3)
 (11)
 (10)
 (7)
 (6)
 (2)
 (4)
 (13)
 (16)
 (14)
 (5)
 (14)
 (4)
 (10)
 (12)
 (3)
 (6)
 (1)
 (1)

References

External links
 World Karate Federation
 Official website
 Result book

 
World Championships
2018 in Spanish sport
2018
Karate competitions in Spain
Sports competitions in Madrid
November 2018 sports events in Spain
International karate competitions hosted by Spain
2018 in Madrid